Thomas Konrad (born 5 November 1989) is a German former professional footballer who played as a centre-back.

Career
On 13 July 2014, Konrad appeared as a trialist for Dundee in their pre-season fixture against Manchester City, doing enough to impress manager Paul Hartley who expressed a desire to offer the player a contract. He and his compatriot Luka Tankulić subsequently signed two-year contracts with Dundee in July 2014. Konrad left Dens Park at the end of the 2015–16 season.

After playing for FC Vaduz and several German teams, Konrad signed with Regionalliga Südwest side FSV Frankfurt in June 2021. At the end of the season, Konrad officially announced his retirement from professional football. In May 2022, 1899 Hoffenheim confirmed that Konrad had joined the club as an youth coach and youth scout.

Honours
Vaduz
Liechtenstein Football Cup: 2016-17

References

External links

1989 births
Living people
Association football central defenders
German footballers
2. Bundesliga players
3. Liga players
Regionalliga players
Scottish Professional Football League players
Swiss Super League players
Swiss Challenge League players
Karlsruher SC II players
Karlsruher SC players
SV Eintracht Trier 05 players
Dundee F.C. players
FC Vaduz players
German expatriate sportspeople in Liechtenstein
Expatriate footballers in Liechtenstein
VfL Osnabrück players
FC Viktoria 1889 Berlin players
German expatriate footballers
German expatriate sportspeople in Switzerland
Expatriate footballers in Switzerland
German expatriate sportspeople in Scotland
Expatriate footballers in Scotland
FSV Frankfurt players
People from Bruchsal
Sportspeople from Karlsruhe (region)
Footballers from Baden-Württemberg